Gustave Tassell (February 4, 1926 – June 9, 2014) was an American fashion designer and Coty Award winner who became a fashion star in the early 1960s with starkly refined clothes that appealed to women like Jacqueline Kennedy Onassis, Greer Garson and Princess Grace of Monaco. Tassell (pronounced Tass-SELL) designed clothes that Jackie Kennedy wore as first lady on a highly publicized goodwill tour of India in 1962. That year the fashion press hailed him as one of America's hottest new designers.

Early life and career
Tassell was born on February 4, 1926, in Philadelphia, Pennsylvania to Lena (née Schiller; 1901–1973) and Samuel Tassell (1896–1963). His father was a businessman who owned amusement parks. Encouraged by his mother, he studied painting at the Pennsylvania Academy of Fine Arts. After serving in the Army, Tassell was studying painting in New York City in the late 1940s when he took a job in the advertising and display department for Hattie Carnegie, a pioneer in the fashion design world who was well known for both custom-made and high-end ready-to-wear clothes. Inspired by Carnegie designer Norman Norell, he shifted into designing and in 1952 moved to Paris, where he made sketches for various couturiers, including Jacques Fath. During this period he met James Galanos, who suggested he start his own line.

In 1956 Tassell set up shop in Los Angeles and soon became "one of the stalwarts of the apparel industry," said Ilse Metchek, president of the California Fashion Assn. By 1958 Tassell was hosting his first show in a cramped workroom on Sunset Boulevard and within a few days had more than $20,000 in orders. A 1959 review commended his style as "akin to Paris' Balenciaga." "He was inspired by both Balenciaga and Norell," said Dilys Blum, senior curator for costumes and textiles at the Philadelphia Museum of Art, which showed Tassell’s work along with that of Galanos and another Philadelphia native, Ralph Rucci, in the show "A Passion for Perfection" in 2007. "He continued the Norell legacy." In 1962, the year after he won the Coty Award, Jacqueline Kennedy was photographed in India wearing a shimmering yellow silk Tassell dress while riding an elephant. The dress was among the Tassell designs showcased in a 2001 exhibit at New York's Metropolitan Museum of Art called "Jacqueline Kennedy: The White House Years." In 1972 he moved to New York to run Norell's fashion house after Norell died. He returned to designing under his own label in 1976 after the business ran into financial difficulties and closed.

Style
His clientele desired what he called "a subtle form of chic" — coats, dresses and evening wear in fine silks and gabardines and subdued colors, with simple lines that skimmed the body and price tags that sometimes exceeded those for a car. The most embellishment he allowed was a sprinkling of rhinestones or diamonds. He did not chase trends, a quality that appealed to the women of means who filled his showroom in the '60s and '70s. Betsy Bloomingdale, wife of department store heir Alfred Bloomingdale, once bragged about a cotton dress by Tassell she had owned for 12 years "and I still wheel it out every summer and get compliments on it every time. Last summer I wore it barefoot for dinner," she told the New York Times in 1969.

Tassell's design sensibility changed little from the 20th to the 21st century—he sought to create forward-looking fashion appropriate for elegant, confident women. He envisioned designs in natural fibers able to serve many purposes, with changing silhouette according to how the garment was buttoned, seamed, or tucked. Tassell aimed to produce affordable clothing with a sense of proportion, grace, and design.

"Stardust Memories"
Once described as a "brunet Harpo Marx" because of his curly hair, Tassell earned a bit part as a cabaret patron in director Woody Allen's 1980 movie "Stardust Memories." Allen spotted him at the popular New York hangout Elaine's "and liked his face," said his sister, Rebecca Welles Weis.

Death
According to Tassell's sister, actress Rebecca Welles, Tassell succumbed to complications from Alzheimer's disease in Los Angeles on June 9, 2014.

References

Modern Fashion Encyclopedia.

External links

1926 births
American fashion designers
Artists from Philadelphia
2014 deaths
Deaths from dementia in California
Deaths from Alzheimer's disease